The 2003 Men's European Water Polo Championship was the 26th edition of the event, organised by the Europe's governing body in aquatics, the Ligue Européenne de Natation. The event took place in the Aquatic Centre in Kranj, Slovenia from June 6 to June 15, 2003. 

There were two qualification tournaments ahead of the event, held from April 9 to April 13, 2003 in Kyiv, Ukraine (with Belarus, Spain, Germany, Netherlands, France and Ukraine competing) and Bratislava, Slovakia (Greece, Slovakia, Romania, Poland, Malta and Turkey).

Teams

GROUP A
 

 

 
 

GROUP B

Preliminary round

GROUP A

GROUP B

Quarterfinals
Thiursday June 12, 2003

Semifinals
Friday June 13, 2003

Finals
Sunday June 15, 2003 —  Bronze Medal

Sunday June 15, 2003 —  Gold Medal

Final ranking

Individual awards
Most Valuable Player

Best Goalkeeper

Topscorer
— 24 goals

References
 Results

Men
2003
International water polo competitions hosted by Slovenia
European Championship
Water polo